Leubsdorf is a village of Rhineland-Palatinate, Germany, in the district of Neuwied.

Geography
The village of Leubsdorf consists of the four parts Leubsdorf, Hesseln, Rothe Kreuz and Krumscheid.

History
First known documents about Leubsdorf date back to 1250. Much older documents of the year 640 are existent under "Lupstorf". The first church in Leubsdorf was built in the 13th century.

Sightseeing
Besides the impressive castle many half-timbered houses and old crosses are telling about history. The construction of the castle is to be mentioned in the 13th century.
The most important celebration in Leubsdorf is the Walpurgis-Kirmes, which is organized by the Katholischer Junggesellenverein (The Catholic Youth).

References

External links
 Webpage of the Ortsgemeinde Leubsdorf
 Information about Kirmes and the Junggesellenverein Leubsdorf e.V.

Neuwied (district)